Redbird trains were eight New York City Subway train models so-nicknamed because of their red paint. The Redbirds totaled 1,410 cars of the following types on the A Division lines: R26, R28, R29, R33, R33S, and R36. There were also 550 cars on the B Division lines: R27 and R30/A. All were built by the American Car and Foundry Company and the St. Louis Car Company. 

These cars were painted a deep red to combat graffiti, which had become a major problem in the late 1970s and early 1980s. The color was referred to as "Gunn Red" or "Broad Street Red" in honor of its originator David L. Gunn, the former SEPTA General Manager who became President of the New York City Transit Authority during this period. Initially entering service in various colors, these cars received the new paint scheme between 1984 and 1989. Sixteen R17s were also given this paint scheme in 1985 and 1986, but were retired by 1988, well before the name "Redbird" caught on. Today, repurposed Redbird cars serve as garbage trains, rail adhesion cars, or rider cars on locomotive-hauled work trains, while others have been preserved by various museums.

History
These cars were built by two different manufacturers.
 American Car and Foundry built the R26 cars in 1959–1960 and the R28 in 1960–1961.
 St. Louis Car Company built the R27 cars in 1960–1961, the R29 in 1962, the R30/A in 1961–1962, the R33 in 1962–1963, R33S single cars in late 1963, and the R36 in 1963–1964.

The IRT cars were occasionally used on Fan Trips on some B Division services as well.

Retirements and replacements
The BMT Redbirds were retired from 1989 to 1993, with the final R30 trip taking place on the C on June 25, 1993. Replaced by the R68 and R68A cars, most cars were scrapped at what is now Sims Metal Management's Newark facility. Most IRT Redbirds were phased out from 2001 to 2003 and replaced by the new R142 and R142A cars.

Preservation
Some Redbirds (R33s, R33Ss, and R36s) are used on the Train of Many Colors, including numerous historical subway cars in their original livery, all with contrasting colors. These cars are in the New York Transit Museum fleet. R28 pair 7926–7927 is preserved at the Illinois Railway Museum in Union, Illinois, with trolley poles added for the ability to run on the museum's mainline. R33S 9327 is at the Seashore Trolley Museum, also modified with trolley poles for operation at the site. Only two BMT Redbirds are still in existence: cars 8481 and 8522, which survive in storage at 207th Street Yard.

Other usage of Redbird name
The MBTA Red Line in Boston used the Redbird name starting in the late 1970s when that line's rolling stock was repainted into a largely red scheme. However, that usage of Redbird followed a tradition set with those fleet's prior paint schemes ("Bluebirds" for the 01400s, "Silverbirds" for the 01500s and 01600s).

Gallery

References
Notes

Sources
 New York Times.  "Refloating a Notion About Subways" by Jeremy Pearce.  April 28, 2002.
New York Times. "Growing Pains for a Deep-Sea Home Built of Subway Cars" by Ian Urbina.  April 8, 2008.

External links

New York City Subway rolling stock